was a Japanese political figure. He served as acting prime minister of Japan in 1980 after the sudden death of Masayoshi Ōhira. He then served as foreign minister of Japan from 1980 to 1981.

Early life
Ito was born on 15 December 1913 in Aizuwakamatsu, Fukushima, where his grandfather was a member of the Aizu clan.

Career
Following the death of Masayoshi Ōhira, Ito became the acting prime minister for a brief period of about a month. In this brief period, he received a report in July from the Comprehensive National Security Study Group which encouraged Ito to strengthen Japan–United States relations whilst also increasing Japanese military self-sufficiency in light of developments within socialist Asia, such as the Sino-Vietnamese War and the Soviet invasion in Afghanistan, which seemed to signal reductions in American power on the continent. Following this brief period, Ito served as Foreign Minister from July 1980 to May 1981 in the cabinet of Zenko Suzuki, but he resigned from this position following American outrage at what the US government perceived as the Japanese government distancing itself from the US-Japanese military alliance following the previously mentioned Asian war developments.

Ito developed a reputation as a "clean" and honest politician who did not become mired in scandals, and for this reason was suggested as a possible successor to Prime Minister Noboru Takeshita after he resigned in disgrace due to the Recruit scandal, although Ito expressed doubts about whether the LDP was serious about reform after top party bosses rejected his comprehensive reform agenda and he thus declined.

Personal life
Ito was a cinephile and expressed himself as an avid fan of Mitsuko Mori. Ito, then battling with diabetes, died on 21 May 1994.

References

|-

|-

|-
|-

|-

1913 births
1994 deaths
20th-century prime ministers of Japan
University of Tokyo alumni
Members of the House of Representatives (Japan)
Government ministers of Japan
Deputy Prime Ministers of Japan
Foreign ministers of Japan
Prime Ministers of Japan
Liberal Democratic Party (Japan) politicians

Politicians from Fukushima Prefecture